 was an amateur photographer who lived on and energetically photographed Sado island in the Sea of Japan.

Kondō was born to a landowning family in Kanazawa village (subsequently part of Kanai, which in turn was amalgamated within "Sado City"). He started with a camera at 18, and also had a keen interest in archaeology. Kondō photographed landscapes and a great variety of life on the island, as well as the figures from literary and artistic circles on the mainland who came to visit during the infancy of Sado's tourism industry. He financed this by gradually selling off land owned by the family.

Kondō was keen to keep up with the latest news on the island. He helped set up the Sado museum (Sado Hakubutsukan), of which he became a trustee, and organizations devoted to mountain walking and botany.

Kondō left a collection of about 8,840 plates on his death. These were bought by the bus company Niigata Kōtsū, which presented them to the Sado museum, but they were little known until 1979, when they were seen by Haruo Tomiyama (himself a notable photographer of Sado) and others. Four years later they became an Asahi Camera cover story, and thanks to the effort of Tomiyama and others they have been exhibited in Sado and anthologized in two books. The photographs then had some exposure in the general-interest media; for example, the 17 August 1995 issue of the magazine Serai (Sarai) had a six-page feature on them.

Sado City has recently started a photography contest in Kondō's honour.

Books of Kondō's works
Sado. Iwanami Shashin Bunko 73. Tokyo: Iwanami Shoten, 1952. Kondō is listed as one of two individual photographers who photographed the content with three organizations. 
Sado mangekyō, ed. Haruo Tomiyama. Matsumoto: Kyōdo Shuppansha, 1994. . A generous anthology of Kondō's work, showing family life, farming, tourism, new technology, popular spectacles, and much else. 
Sado shashinchō, ed. Hisao Kondō and Kinzō Isobe. Matsumoto: Kyōdo Shuppansha, 2000. .

Notes

References

  Nihon no shashinka / Biographic Dictionary of Japanese Photography. Tokyo: Nichigai Associates, 2005. . Despite the English-language alternative title, all in Japanese.
 Nihon shashinka jiten / 328 Outstanding Japanese Photographers. Kyoto: Tankōsha, 2000. .
 "Sado 1918–1949". Asahi Camera, December 1983. Pp. 15–46. A collection of Kondō's works.
 Shashinshū o yomu: Besuto 338 kanzen gaido (Reading photobooks: A complete guide to the best 338). Tokyo: Metarōgu, 1997. . Sado mangekyō is written up.

External links
 : the lower third or so of this page is devoted to the works of Kondō; there are clickable thumbnails of four of his works.
 Dai-go-kai Sado-kuni Biennāre Kondō-Tomio-shō Shashin Kontesuto: a Sado City page that invites submissions for the Kondō Tomio award.

Japanese photographers
Artists from Niigata Prefecture
1900 births
1957 deaths
People from Sado, Niigata